The canton of Villeneuve-sur-Lot-2 is an administrative division of the Lot-et-Garonne department, southwestern France. It was created at the French canton reorganisation which came into effect in March 2015. Its seat is in Villeneuve-sur-Lot.

It consists of the following communes:
Bias
Hautefage-la-Tour
Pujols
Saint-Antoine-de-Ficalba
Sainte-Colombe-de-Villeneuve
Villeneuve-sur-Lot (partly)

References

Cantons of Lot-et-Garonne